The Half Tail is the fourth album by Scottish Celtic rock group Wolfstone. It was released in 1996.

It was released in August 1996, first in limited quantities on 6 August, followed by a wider release on August 26. A promo poster for 26 August was distributed.

Reviews were positive for the album.

Track listing
 "Zeto" - 4:13
Zeto the Bubbleman
Electric Chopsticks
 "Tall Ships" - 4:56
 "Gillies" - 6:42
The Sleeping Tune
The Noose and the Gillies
 "Heart and Soul" - 3:17
 "Granny Hogg's Enormous Wallet" - 3:43
Duncan Chisholm
Granny Hogg's Enormous Wallet
 "Bonnie Ship the Diamond" - 5:54
Bonnie Ship the Diamond
The Last Leviathan
 "Glenglass" - 5:26
 "Clueless" - 3:57
Clueless
Fleshmarket Close
The Steampacket
 "No Tie Ups" - 4:07

Personnel
Duncan Chisholm: fiddle
Stuart Eaglesham: acoustic guitar, electric guitar, vocals, whistle
Struan Eaglesham: keyboards
Ivan Drever: lead vocals, acoustic guitar, electric guitar, bouzouki
Wayne Mackenzie: bass guitar
Mop Youngson: drums
Stevie Saint: pipes
Iain Macdonald: flute
Sandro Ciancio: percussion
Fraser Spiers: harmonica

Wolfstone albums
1996 albums